The 1947 Princeton Tigers football team was an American football team that represented Princeton University during the 1947 college football season.  In its third season under head coach Charlie Caldwell, the team compiled a 5–4 record and outscored opponents by a total of 140 to 100. The team played its home games at Palmer Stadium in Princeton, New Jersey.

Key players on the team included fullback George Franke and halfback George Sella.

Schedule

References

Princeton
Princeton Tigers football seasons
Princeton Tigers football